Siege of Ganja may refer to:

 Siege of Ganja (1213), successful siege of the city of Ganja, by the Georgians under King George IV
 Siege of Ganja (1606), successful siege of the city of Ganja, by the Safavids
 Siege of Ganja (1734), successful siege of the city of Ganja, by the Safavids